Morphological antialiasing (MLAA) is a technique for minimizing the distortion artifacts known as aliasing when representing a high-resolution image at a lower resolution. 

Contrary to multisample anti-aliasing (MSAA), which does not work for deferred rendering, MLAA is a post-process filtering which detects borders in the resulting image and then finds specific patterns in these. Anti-aliasing is achieved by blending pixels in these borders, according to the pattern they belong to and their position within the pattern.

Enhanced subpixel morphological antialiasing, or SMAA, is an image-based GPU-based implementation of MLAA developed by Universidad de Zaragoza and Crytek.

See also
 Fast approximate anti-aliasing
 Multisample anti-aliasing
 Anisotropic filtering
 Temporal anti-aliasing
 Spatial anti-aliasing

References

Image processing
Computer graphic artifacts
Anti-aliasing algorithms